Goodbye, My Fancy is a 1951 American romantic comedy film starring Joan Crawford, Robert Young, and Frank Lovejoy. The film was directed by Vincent Sherman and produced by Henry Blanke. Distributed by Warner Bros., the film was based on the 1948 play of same name by Fay Kanin and adapted for the screen by Ivan Goff and Ben Roberts. Reinforcing social changes brought on by World War II and movies portraying women as successful on their own, such as 1945's Academy Award-winning Mildred Pierce, the plot follows an influential Congresswoman who returns to her former college to receive an honorary degree only to find her old flame as the university president.

Goodbye, My Fancy was the third and last cinematic collaboration between Sherman and Crawford, the first two being Harriet Craig and The Damned Don't Cry in 1950.

Plot
Powerful U.S. Representative Agatha Reed (Joan Crawford) returns to her alma mater to receive an honorary degree. Unbeknownst to the college's board of trustees, Agatha was expelled from the school years earlier for participating in an all-night date with a young professor, Dr. James Merrill (Robert Young), who is now the university president. The romantic fires are rekindled when the two meet. Matt Cole (Frank Lovejoy), a photographer from Life magazine had been involved with Agatha overseas in World War II - as far as buying an engagement ring before she skipped out on him -  believes her feeling for Merrill is simply an unresolved holdover from her girlhood and follows her to the school.

Agatha becomes embroiled in a university matter over progressive teaching methods with Dr. Pitt (Morgan Farley), board trustee Claude Griswold (Howard St. John) and his wife Ellen Griswold (Lurene Tuttle). A film Agatha made about the dangers of restricting intellectual freedom is to be shown on campus to celebrate her legacy, but the reactionary Griswold forces Merrill to cancel the showing. Merrill will not stand up to Griswold, and though Merrill consents to show the film if Agatha's expulsion is not revealed, he lies to his daughter about the reason why. After a series of misunderstandings, Agatha realizes she belongs with Cole and should forget the way she fancied Merrill.

Cast

 Joan Crawford – Agatha Reed
 Robert Young – Doctor James Merrill
 Frank Lovejoy – Matt Cole 
 Eve Arden – Miss 'Woody' Woods 
 Janice Rule – Virginia Merrill
 Lurene Tuttle – Ellen Griswold 
 Howard St. John – Claude Griswold 
 Viola Roache – Miss Shackelford
 Ellen Corby – Miss Birdshaw
 Morgan Farley – Doctor Pitt 
 Virginia Gibson – Mary Nell Dodge 
 John Qualen – Professor Dingley

Production
Director Vincent Sherman both ran long and over-budget in the filming.  In danger of being replaced, this triggered Sherman receiving a blistering memo from studio head Jack L. Warner: "After talking to you on the telephone last night, Friday, I am depending on you to finish the picture by next Saturday, November 18th [1950]. As I told you, other companies are making the same type of picture in 21-28-36 days with important casts. As you know, MGM made Father's Little Dividend, with Spencer Tracy, Elizabeth Taylor and Joan Bennett in 21 days and I am sure the Director had the same problems you have had. You will just have to do this. Otherwise, we cannot stand off this type of cost and delay in making a picture. Those days are gone and no one is going to stay on the team unless they can carry the ball. Get in there and finish the picture by next Saturday or before and stop trying for perfection. No one is interested but yourself and I am sure you are not going to pay to see the picture."  

Large portions of the film were shot at the University of Redlands in Redlands, California.

Reception
The critics were mixed on the success of the film.  Variety commented, "Performances are very slick, under Vincent Sherman's direction. Miss Crawford...sustains the romantic, middle-aged congresswoman with a light touch that is excellent." However, Bosley Crowther in The New York Times generally panned the film, writing, "Miss Crawford's errant congresswoman is as aloof and imposing as the capital dome" and "Joan Crawford is working extra hard to make romance and liberalism attractive in the Warner's film version [of the play]. And when Miss Crawford makes a mighty effort to do what she obviously regards as a significant piece of performing, the atmosphere is electrically charged. At least, it is loaded with tension—or a reasonable facsimile thereof—when Miss Crawford herself is posing or parading within the camera's range.

Box office
According to Warner Bros records the film cost $1,312,000 to produce, and earned $1,130,000 domestically and $228,000 foreign, for a gross revenue of $1,358,000 and slim profit of $46,000.

DVD release
Goodbye, My Fancy was released on Region 1 DVD on March 23, 2009 from the online Warner Bros. Archive Collection.

References

External links
 
 
 
 

1951 films
1951 romantic comedy films
American romantic comedy films
American black-and-white films
Films about politicians
American films based on plays
Films directed by Vincent Sherman
Warner Bros. films
1950s English-language films
1950s American films